The Battle of Cholet may refer to:

 The First Battle of Cholet, a battle of the War in the Vendée in March 1793.
 The Second Battle of Cholet, battle of the French Revolutionary Wars in October 1793.